Winthrop R. Adkins (October 25, 1932 – July 16, 2015) was a professor emeritus of psychology and education at Teachers College, Columbia University.

Early life and education
Adkins was born in Beirut, Syria (now Lebanon) to Turkish and Syrian missionaries Leslie John Adkins and Edith Sanderson. Adkins was a graduate of Phillips Academy and in 1955 became an alumni at Princeton University along with a classmate Ralph Nader. For 12 years, Adkins served in the US Navy starting from Naval Reserve Officers Training Corps and climbing up the ranks to a naval officer on the USS Salem and even serving on a flagship of the US Sixth Fleet in the Mediterranean waters. While there, he also received training in Naval Justice School, served on various vessels as court marshal, and later became attendee of the Naval War College in Newport, Rhode Island. Following his service, Adkins returned to Columbia, where in 1958 he got his master's degree in psychology.

Career
In 1963, after obtained his doctorate in counseling psychology from Teachers College, Columbia University, Adkins immediately joined its faculty in order to work on his Career Pattern Study. For one year, he moved to Harvard University where he spent at its Center for Personality, studying achievement motivation with David McClelland. After his short lived Harvard appointment, Atkins indulged into War on Poverty and worked with YMCA of the City of Greater New York.

In 1966, Adkins became a founding faculty member of the York College, City University of New York, where he supervised the Search for Education, Elevation and Knowledge project. The project later turned into a program whose goal is to provide support for low income students. The program is still used today by the City University System.

During the next 30 years, Adkins worked at Teachers College, Columbia University and at the Institute for Life Coping Skills, where he developed new methods for helping people to deal with complex attitudes and behaviors they might encounter in their everyday life. His major focus was the development of multi-media counseling systems.

Adkins then worked with Paul Sharar and Sidney Rosenberg to develop Training Resources for Youth, a program that was implemented by 2,000 agencies in 40 states ever since its founding in late 1970s.

During his career, Adkins trained many graduate students on how to develop psychological and behavioral interventions, using his methods and theory. He served on many non-profit boards of directors, including the HOPE Program for the homeless, the NYS Advisory Group on Adult Education, the Greenwich Adult and Continuing Program and the Center for Insurance Research, and was a founding member of the Princeton Project '55 Center for Civic Leadership.

ASLP
Adkins is better known as a pioneer behind the Adkins Life Skills Career Development Program (ASLP), which was originally published by Psychological Corporation, a division of Harcourt Assessment. The program, which besides English comes in Spanish and Italian languages, helped over 1 million people to obtain degrees (and later jobs). The program was used by over 2,000 agencies in 45 states, which includes such facilities as prisons, homeless shelters, drug rehabilitation centers, welfare-to-work programs, economic opportunity centers and community colleges. Based on the program, the Institute for Life Coping Skills had trained over 5000 staff as Life Skills Educators who promoted the program in their own agencies. Later on, as many as 200 community colleges in India had adopted the Life Coping Skills curriculum which was used in their country to help students from rural provinces learn how to understand urban life.

Death and personal life
Adkins died following lung surgery at the age of 82. He was married to professor emerita, Caroline Manuele Adkins, who is also a psychologist. Together they raised a son, Jason and daughter, Jennifer.

References

External links
Winthrop Adkins

1932 births
2015 deaths
20th-century American psychologists
Phillips Academy alumni
Princeton University alumni
Teachers College, Columbia University alumni
York College, City University of New York faculty
Harvard University faculty
Teachers College, Columbia University faculty
American expatriates in Lebanon